Rosemary Lucas Ginn (August 28, 1912 Columbia, Missouri – February 3, 2003) was the American Ambassador to Luxembourg from 1976 until 1977.

Ginn graduated from the David Henry Hickman High School, Class of 1929.

She previously had been heavily involved in Republican polotics in Missouri. From 1959-1961 she was the head of the Republican Women's Clubs of Missouri. She beganning serving as a Missouri delegate to the RNC in 1960 and was a member of the RNC executive committee from 1962-1964.

References

American women ambassadors
Hickman High School alumni
People from Columbia, Mississippi
Ambassadors of the United States to Luxembourg
20th-century American diplomats
20th-century American women
1912 births
2003 deaths
21st-century American women